Basil Hexamilites was a Byzantine military leader who won a major victory against the Hamdanid navy of Tarsus.

Biography
As his surname indicates, he hailed from Hexamilion in eastern Thrace. 

In  he was a patrikios and the military governor (strategos) of the naval Cibyrrhaeot Theme. Theophanes Continuatus reports that he was still young, but an experienced and capable commander. Since the late 9th century, the fleet of the Muslim frontier emirate of Tarsus in Cilicia had been a major threat for Byzantium. In Hexamilites' time, the city of Tarsus had come under the control of the Hamdanid emir of Aleppo, Sayf al-Dawla. Despite his disposing of fewer ships, Hexamilites led his fleet against the Tarsians, sinking many ships with Greek fire—which may indicate that his forces had been augmented with ships from the central Imperial Fleet—and inflicting many casualties and taking many prisoners. According to the Muslim historian Ibn al-Athir, this action took place in September/October 956 and cost the Tarsians 1,800 dead.

This victory was crucial for Byzantium, as it crippled the Tarsian fleet and opened the way the expedition to recover Crete, led by Nikephoros Phokas, in 960–961.

References

Sources
 

10th-century Byzantine military personnel
Byzantine admirals
Governors of the Cibyrrhaeot Theme
Byzantine people of the Arab–Byzantine wars
Patricii
People from Gelibolu